Zab may refer to:

Geography
The Zab rivers:
Great Zab, or Upper Zab, river tributary to the Tigris
Little Zab, or Lower Zab, river tributary to the Tigris
 Al Zab, an Iraqi town at the confluence of the Little Zab with the Tigris
M'zab, a region in Algeria
Zab Emirate, a 15th century Algerian state
Zweibrücken Air Base (ZAB), a former air base in West Germany
Ząb, a village in Poland

History
Battle of the Zab, by the Great Zab in 750

People
Zab Judah, American professional boxer
Zab Maboungou, Franco-Congolese writer and choreographer

Abbreviations 
 zab, the ISO 639-3 code for the San Juan Guelavía Zapotec language
 RU-ZAB, the ISO 3166-2 code for Zabaykalsky Krai
 Albuquerque Air Route Traffic Control Center, New Mexico, US, known as ZAB
 Zookeeper Atomic Broadcast, a consensus protocol used in Apache ZooKeeper